Lucien Sergi (born September 20, 1971) is a former professional footballer who played 
as a right-back.

See also
Football in France
List of football clubs in France

References

External links
Lucien Sergi profile at chamoisfc79.fr

1971 births
Living people
French footballers
Association football defenders
Louhans-Cuiseaux FC players
Chamois Niortais F.C. players
Grenoble Foot 38 players
Ligue 2 players
Thonon Evian Grand Genève F.C. players